Mahendra Bhatt is an Indian politician and member of the Bharatiya Janata Party. Mahendra Bhatt is currently serving as BJP Uttarakhand State President. Bhatt was a member of the Uttarakhand Legislative Assembly from the Badrinath constituency in Chamoli district.
(2017-2022) a member of the Uttarakhand Legislative Assembly from the Badrinath constituency in Chamoli district.

References 

People from Chamoli district
Bharatiya Janata Party politicians from Uttarakhand
Members of the Uttarakhand Legislative Assembly
Living people
Uttarakhand MLAs 2017–2022
1971 births